Elsad Zverotić (born 31 October 1986) is a former professional footballer who played as a right-back or right midfielder. Born in SFR Yugoslavia, he represented the Switzerland U18 national team before switching to the Montenegro U21. He is the Montenegro senior national team's second most-capped player of all time, with 61 caps between 2008 and 2017.

Club career
Zverotić joined BSC Young Boys in the summer of 2011. On 22 November 2012 in the UEFA Europa League group stage, Zverotić scored a memorable goal against Liverpool at Anfield in a 2–2 draw.

On 2 September 2013, Zverotić signed a two-year contract with Fulham, with the option for an additional year for an undisclosed fee. He left the club by mutual consent on 16 February 2015.

The following day, he returned to Switzerland, signing a two-and-a-half-year deal at Sion. In November 2017, he was one of seven players demoted to the reserve team by new manager Gabri García.

International career
After beginning his career in the country, Zverotić was called up by Switzerland's under-18 side. However, he then pledged his international career to his native Montenegro, playing his first match for the Montenegro U21 team against Albania on 2 May 2007.

On 7 September 2010, Zverotić his first international goal, the only one against Bulgaria in a Euro 2012 qualifier, striking from 30 yards at the Vasil Levski National Stadium in Sofia. He scored in another qualifier against England on 7 October 2011, Montenegro's first as they came from behind to earn a 2–2 draw in Podgorica. Zverotić scored two goals in 2014 FIFA World Cup qualification, one in each of their victories over San Marino. His final international was a September 2017 FIFA World Cup  qualification match against Romania.

He is the second most capped Montenegrin footballer with 61 matches after Fatos Bećiraj who has 63.

Honours 
Sion
Swiss Cup: 2014–15

References

External links

1986 births
Living people
People from Berane
Bosniaks of Montenegro
Swiss people of Montenegrin descent
Association football fullbacks
Swiss men's footballers
Switzerland youth international footballers
Montenegrin footballers
Montenegro under-21 international footballers
Montenegro international footballers
FC Wil players
FC Luzern players
BSC Young Boys players
Fulham F.C. players
FC Sion players
FC Aarau players
2. Liga Interregional players
Swiss Challenge League players
Swiss Super League players
Premier League players
English Football League players
Montenegrin expatriate footballers
Swiss expatriate footballers
Expatriate footballers in Switzerland
Montenegrin expatriate sportspeople in Switzerland
Expatriate footballers in England
Montenegrin expatriate sportspeople in England